Jan Verelst (born ca 1960) is a Belgian computer scientist, Professor and Dean of the Department of Management Information Systems at the University of Antwerp, and Professor at the Antwerp Management School, known for his work on Normalized Systems.

Biography 
Verelst obtained his Ph.D. in Management Information Systems in 1999 from the University of Antwerp with a thesis entitled "De invloed van variabiliteit op de evolueerbaarheid van conceptuele modellen van informatiesystemen" (The impact of variability on the evolvability of conceptual models of information systems).

After his graduation he was appointed Professor of Systems Development Methodology at the Faculty of Applied Economics of the University of Antwerp, and Dean of the Department of Management Information Systems. He is also appointed as Professor at Antwerp Management School.

His research interests are in the field of "conceptual modeling of information systems, evolvability, and maintainability of information systems, empirical software engineering, and open source software", specifically the development of Normalized Systems, and its development methodology.

Publications 
Verelst authored and co-authored many publications in his field of expertise. Books:
 
 

Articles, a selection:
 Du Bois, Bart, Serge Demeyer, and Jan Verelst. "Refactoring-improving coupling and cohesion of existing code." Reverse Engineering, 2004. Proceedings. 11th Working Conference on. IEEE, 2004.
 Hidders, J., Dumas, M., van der Aalst, W. M., ter Hofstede, A. H., & Verelst, J. (2005, January). "When are two workflows the same?." In Proceedings of the 2005 Australasian symposium on Theory of computing-Volume 41 (pp. 3–11). Australian Computer Society, Inc..
 Ven, Kris, Jan Verelst, and Herwig Mannaert. "Should you adopt open source software?." IEEE Software 25.3 (2008): 54-59.
 Huysmans, Philip, Kris Ven, and Jan Verelst. "Using the DEMO methodology for modeling open source software development processes." Information and Software Technology 52.6 (2010): 656-671.

References

External links 
 Verelst Jan, Antwerp Management School

Year of birth missing (living people)
Living people
Belgian computer scientists
University of Antwerp alumni
Academic staff of the University of Antwerp